Arizona v. City and County of San Francisco, 596 U.S. ___ (2022), was a United States Supreme Court case related to the ability of states to defend federal regulations in court.

Background 

The Trump administration issued the public charge rule in 2019. The rule was intended to prevent recent non-citizen immigrants to the United States from becoming eligible for public assistance. Before the regulation took effect, various courts enjoined its enforcement. Lawsuits were filed in California, Illinois, New York, Maryland, and other states. The Supreme Court stayed nationwide injunctions issued by district courts in New York and Illinois in January and February 2020. In December 2020, the United States Court of Appeals for the Ninth Circuit held by a 2–1 vote that the public charge rule was unlawful. Certiorari was granted in a case reviewing the similar judgment of the United States Court of Appeals for the Second Circuit in February 2021. That case, Department of Homeland Security v. New York, was dismissed by an agreement between the Biden administration and the plaintiffs in March 2021. A coalition of states led by Arizona attempted to intervene in defense of the rule in multiple courts across the country and were unsuccessful each time. That coalition then appealed the Ninth Circuit case to the Supreme Court.

Supreme Court 

Certiorari was granted in the case on October 29, 2021. The court heard oral arguments on February 23, 2022. Arizona Attorney General Mark Brnovich argued for the petitioners. On June 15, 2022, the Supreme Court dismissed the petition as improvidently granted. Chief Justice John Roberts concurred.

See also 
 List of United States Supreme Court leaks

References

External links 
 

2022 in United States case law
United States Supreme Court cases
United States Supreme Court cases of the Roberts Court
United States Supreme Court per curiam opinions
United States civil procedure case law